Tawthalin is the sixth month of the traditional Burmese calendar.

Festivals and events
Boat Regatta Festival

Tawthalin symbols
Flower: Chukrasia velutina

References

See also
Burmese calendar
Festivals of Burma
Vassa

Months of the Burmese calendar